Laurence Cecil Bartlett Gower   (29 December 1913 – 25 December 1997) known as 'Jim' and universally credited as "LCB Gower" in his writings, was a lawyer and academic who was Vice Chancellor of the University of Southampton from 1971–79.

Early life
He was born in Forest Gate, London (then part of Essex) and educated at Lindisfarne College. He then attended University College, London graduating LLB with first class honours in 1933 and LLM in 1934. He qualified as a solicitor in 1937.

War service
He served in the army throughout World War II initially in the Royal Artillery (RA) as a Private where he served under Sir Mortimer Wheeler. He ended service as a Lieutenant-Colonel in the Royal Army Ordnance Corps (RAOC). He was involved in the planning at Wilton House of the D-Day landings in France.

Academic career
After leaving the army, he commenced academic work as a lecturer in law at University College, London. He was also Sir Ernest Cassel Professor of Commercial Law at London School of Economics, University of London from 1948 to 1952 and visiting professor at Harvard Law School from 1954 to 1955. He became professor and dean of the Faculty of Law, University of Lagos from 1962 to 1965 and subsequently vice-chancellor, University of Southampton from 1971 to 1979.

During his time at Southampton, there was increasing financial stringency and increasing student numbers. However, the new Medical School expanded and there was provision of special residential facilities for disabled students. All first year students were able to live in university accommodation. At the same time, he served on Harold Wilson's Royal Commission on the Press. After retirement he was asked by the Department of Trade to provide advice to the Government on financial services resulting in the Financial Services Act 1986. He is best known for his work in the UK company law, where he authored the leading treatise, now taken over by PL Davies,

Personal life
On 7 September 1939, he married Helen Margaret Shepperson (Peggy) Birch (1910/11–1999), a secondary school teacher, and they had two sons and a daughter. He died in Camden, London.

Publications
 The Principles of Modern Company Law (1954), pub. Sweet & Maxwell, 6th revised edition (24 July 1997), .

See also
 List of University of Southampton people
 Gower Report
 UK company law

References

1913 births
1997 deaths
People educated at Lindisfarne College
Alumni of University College London
Vice-Chancellors of the University of Southampton
English solicitors
English legal scholars
Academic staff of the University of Lagos
British expatriates in Nigeria
Academics of the London School of Economics
Lawyers from London
British expatriate academics in the United States
Harvard Law School faculty
British Army personnel of World War II
Members of the Order of the British Empire
20th-century British lawyers
Fellows of the British Academy
20th-century English lawyers
Royal Artillery soldiers
Royal Army Ordnance Corps officers